(Let grant me to say a word of thanks), WAB 62, is a song composed by Anton Bruckner  during his stay in Sankt Florian.

History 
Bruckner composed this song on a text of Ernst Marinelli between 1845 and 1855, during his stay in Sankt Florian. He dedicated the work as thanks to Earl Charles O'Hegerty, the occupant of Tillysburg Castle, near Sankt Florian. It is not known when the song was performed at that time. On 13 May 1996 the work was performed again on the authentic location (Tillysburg Castle).

The original manuscript of the work is lost, but a copy by Karl Aigner is stored in the archives of the Österreichische Nationalbibliothek.

Text 
 uses a text by Ernst Marinelli.

The "angel", to whom the text refers, could be O'Hegerty's wife, who deceased in 1845, or his son, who deceased in 1854.

Music 
The 89-bar long work in F major is scored for  choir with humming voices and soloists.

The song begins with a tenor soloist with accompaniment of humming voices. From bar 15 ("Wenn alle sich vereinen") the choir takes it over. On bar 23 ("O weine nicht,"), the tenor soloist takes it over with again accompaniment of humming voices. The choir takes it again over at the beginning of the third strophe. The same process is repeated on bar 46 ("Du hast's mit ihnen wohl gemeint,") with a bass soloist, and on bar 68 ("Der Arme ruft's,") with two tenor soloists. Thereafter, the choir goes till the end with a repeat of the first part of the fourth strophe.

Discography 
There is a single recording of Des Dankes Wort sei mir vergönnt.
 Thomas Kerbl, Männerchorvereinigung Bruckner 12, Weltliche Männerchöre – CD: LIVA 054, 2012

References

Sources 
 Anton Bruckner – Sämtliche Werke, Band XXIII/2:  Weltliche Chorwerke (1843–1893), Musikwissenschaftlicher Verlag der Internationalen Bruckner-Gesellschaft, Angela Pachovsky and Anton Reinthaler (Editor), Vienna, 1989
 Cornelis van Zwol, Anton Bruckner 1824–1896 – Leven en werken, uitg. Thoth, Bussum, Netherlands, 2012. 
 Uwe Harten, Anton Bruckner. Ein Handbuch. , Salzburg, 1996. .

External links 
 
 Des Dankes Wort sei mir vergönnt F-Dur, WAB 62 – Critical discography by Hans Roelofs 

Weltliche Chorwerke by Anton Bruckner
Compositions in F major